Nekla  is a town in Września County, Greater Poland Voivodeship, Poland, with 6,750 inhabitants (2004).

Cities and towns in Greater Poland Voivodeship
Gmina Nekla